is a Japanese space opera novel series written by Yoshiki Tanaka between 1988 and 2015 and released in five volumes. The series is about people who try to liberate the galaxy from the rule of the Tytania-clan and seek refuge with a rebel force. It has been adapted into manga and anime in 2008–2011.

Plot
In a future where mankind is scattered across the stars, the Empire of Valdana is under the control of the Tytania clan, which forged its influence through intimidation and economic might. In the year 446, Tytania dispatches a large fleet to seize a new piece of technology from the city-state of Euriya. Much to everyone's surprise, Euriya decides to resist and wins. Their isolated act of rebellion sets into motion a sequence of events that strains the careful alliances and treaties within the empire as various factions seek to exploit the situation to their own advantage. In the ensuing turmoil, ambitious members of the Tytania nobility begin moving against each other in an effort to settle old grievances and seize control of the clan. What started as an act of rebellion by Euriya, quickly expands into a civil war – with the wealth and power of the empire up for grabs to whoever is bold enough to seize it.

Meanwhile, Fan Hyulick, the man responsible for Euriya's victory, finds himself the target of an imperial manhunt, one he can only escape by continuing to fight an empire that controls entire worlds.

Characters

Nobility
 
The "Landless Lord" Ajman Tytania is the current head of the Tytania clan.

 
Jouslain Tytania is one of the four dukes in line to succeed Ajman Tytania as the clan's next Landless Lord. His flagship is the Austra.

 
Idris Tytania is the youngest of the four Dukes in line for succeeding as the head of the clan. His flagship is the Fire Phoenix.

 
Ariabert Tytania is one of the four dukes in line to succeed Ajman Tytania as the head of the Tytania Clan. He commands the flagship Golden Sheep.

 
Zarlisch Tytania is one of the four dukes in line to succeed Ajman Tytania as the head of the Tytania Clan. Zarlisch's flagship name is the Typhoon.

 
Lydia is the second princess of the Elbing Kingdom. She currently resides on Uraniborg under the custody of Jouslain Tytania.

Resistance
 
Fan Hyulick is a former admiral of Euria, who inflicted the first defeat to the Tytania clan in 200 years.

 
Lira Florenz is part of the resistance force on Emmental seeking to restore the Principality of Casabianca.

 
Miranda is part of the resistance force and princess to the Principality of Casabianca.

Anime

The anime adaptation of Tytania was produced by Artland and directed  by Noboru Ishiguro.  It aired on NHK's BS-2 satellite channel from October 9, 2008 to March 26, 2009.

Reception

References

External links
  for the anime series 

 Tytania info on The Anime Network, streaming begins July 15, 2010.

1988 Japanese novels
2008 manga
Anime and manga based on light novels
Artland (company)
Kodansha manga
Light novels
Novels by Yoshiki Tanaka
Sentai Filmworks
Shōnen manga
Space opera novels
Space opera anime and manga